David Lennart Philipp (born 10 April 2000) is a German professional footballer who plays as a midfielder for Viktoria Köln.

Career
Philipp joined Werder Bremen's youth academy from Hamburg-based club HEBC in 2014. The 2019–20 season was his first in senior football and he scored seven goals in 18 Regionalliga Nord matches for the club's reserves.

In September 2020, Philipp joined Eredivisie club ADO Den Haag on loan for the 2020–21 season. The deal includes an option for ADO to sign him permanently and one for Werder Bremen to re-sign him. He made his debut for the club on 3 October, scoring the winner in injury time in a 2–1 league win against VVV-Venlo.

References

External links
 
 
 

Living people
2000 births
Association football midfielders
German footballers
Footballers from Hamburg
Regionalliga players
Eredivisie players
HEBC Hamburg players
SV Werder Bremen players
SV Werder Bremen II players
ADO Den Haag players
FC Viktoria Köln players
German expatriate footballers
German expatriate sportspeople in the Netherlands
Expatriate footballers in the Netherlands